The Denel Overberg Test Range is a weapons systems testing facility in the Overberg region on the south coast of South Africa, near Arniston, Western Cape. It includes launch pads and tracking systems.

It was used to test the RSA series of Israeli-South African missiles until cancellation in 1992; since then it has been used by a variety of countries and clients.

Until 31 March 2011, it was known as simply the Overberg Test Range or OTB (Afrikaans abbreviation for Overberg Toetsbaan).

Facilities

Facilities at the site include missile launch pads, tracking radar, optical missile tracking systems, cinetheodolites as well as the use of Overberg Air Force Base, home of the South African Air Force Test Flight and Development Centre. The layout appears to mirror the testing site at Palmachim, suggesting Israeli input in the design process.

Instrumentation includes:
 IRIG timecode telecommand transmission
 Precision instrumentation radars with velocity measurement and ability to track up to three objects simultaneously
 Fixed and mobile Doppler radar receivers to track missile velocities with 3 cm/s accuracy
 Mobile cine theodolites (5-300 frame/s) and a tracking pedestal with film (25–1000 frame/s) and video (50 Hz) capability
 Fixed and mobile telemetry stations for receiving real-time flight data
 16mm, 35mm and 70mm high-speed cameras for photographic documentation of launches, flights and impacts
 Film and video processors for data reduction
 Multiple redundant receiving PCM on FM channels
 Real-time data manipulation and display capabilities
 Quick-look and post-test processing
 Atomic clock for accurate timing
 Multiple interfaces including IRIG-B, IRIG-A, a variety of slow codes, pulses as well as PC parallel and serial.
 Sophisticated command and control infrastructure, including a central control centre, a mobile control centre and a central computer.

Clients
The site was notably used for test launches of the RSA series of missiles, including the joint Israeli-South African RSA-3 Intermediate-range ballistic missile in 1989 and 1990. Development of this military programme was cancelled 1992 however.  Testing for the South African civil space programme continued at the site for another year before also being cancelled in 1993.

Since then the facility has served a number of foreign clients, including:
 Germany for testing Exocet, Sea Sparrow, Taurus and IRIS-T missiles
 Czech Republic
 Singapore for testing Igla missiles
 The UK for evaluation of the Denel Rooivalk helicopter
 Sweden for testing the RBS15 MK3 and CAMPS
 Spain for integration of the Taurus missile on the F-18.
 Turkey; the Turkish Navy held a live fire exercise in May 2014 during which two frigates and a corvette fired various missiles and guns.

Testing
Testing at the site focuses predominantly on flight performance rather than the destructive capability of weapon systems.  Consequently missile test flights are typically conducted with dummy warheads or instrument packs rather than live weapons.

The following types of tests can be performed:
 Air-to-air tests
 Air-to-surface (land or sea) tests
 Surface-to-surface (land or sea) tests
 Anti-tank tests, including from helicopters
 Aircraft performance, carriage and release clearance and avionics evaluation

while the following types of data are provided to clients:
 Trajectories
 Telemetry recording
 Photographic documentation
 Meteorological Profiles

See also
AFB Overberg, South African Air Force base
Test Flight and Development Centre SAAF
South Africa and weapons of mass destruction
Israel–South Africa Agreement

References

External links
 Official website
 Overberg page at global-defence.com
 Overberg page at astronautix.com
 South Africa Profile: Missile Overview by the Nuclear Threat Initiative

Military installations of South Africa
Economy of the Western Cape
Rocket launch sites
Israel–South Africa relations
Denel